Thomas P. Sakmar (born 1956) is an American physician-scientist and the former acting president of The Rockefeller University. Prior to becoming acting president he was Associate Dean for Graduate Studies in the Tri-Institutional MD–PhD Program. 

Sakmar earned his A.B. in chemistry from University of Chicago and in 1982 received his M.D. from University of Chicago Pritzker School of Medicine. He carried out clinical training in internal medicine at Massachusetts General Hospital and postdoctoral training  with H. Gobind Khorana at the Massachusetts Institute of Technology before starting the laboratory of molecular biology and biochemistry at The Rockefeller University in 1990.

With 200 peer-reviewed research articles he is best known for his work on spectral tuning in photopigments and for developing drug discovery methods targeting G protein-coupled receptors. He has been a senior fellow of the Ellison Medical Foundation, an investigator  of the Howard Hughes Medical Institute, the Marie Krogh Visiting Professor at the Novo Nordisk Foundation Center for Basic Metabolic Research at the University of Copenhagen as well as Guest Professor at the Karolinska Institute in Stockholm, Sweden.

In 2020 he was awarded an honorary doctorate (honoris causa) from Karolinska Institute.

References

1956 births
Howard Hughes Medical Investigators
Presidents of Rockefeller University
Living people